Dahme-Spreewald is a district in Brandenburg, Germany. It is bounded by (from the east and clockwise) the districts of Oder-Spree, Spree-Neiße, Oberspreewald-Lausitz, Elbe-Elster and Teltow-Fläming, and by the city of Berlin.

History 
The Spreewald region has always been a centre of Sorbian culture. In medieval times the cities of Lübben and Luckau had successively been capitals of the margravate of Lower Lusatia. From 1815 on Lower Lusatia was a part of Prussia. Throughout the 19th century the region remained an agriculturally used area, some urbanisation taking place in the very north (close to Berlin) only.

When the state of Brandenburg was newly founded in 1990, the districts of Lübben, Luckau and Königs Wusterhausen had been established. In 1993 the three districts were merged.

Geography 
The Spree river enters the district in the southeast and leaves to the northeast. The wooded regions along its banks are called Spreewald. The Spreewald is the westernmost part of Lusatia. Especially the cities of Lübben and Lübbenau welcome many tourists each year, offering boat trips and relaxing holidays in the beautiful Spreewald nature.

The Dahme river is a tributary of the Spree. It forms many lakes in the northern part of the district. The Dahme leaves the district towards Berlin, where it is occasionally used for boat races. Eventually, it joins the Spree.

Demography

Coat of arms 
The coat of arms displays:
 top left: the bull is the heraldic animal of Lusatia
 top right: the eagle is the heraldic animal of Brandenburg
 bottom: the crown symbolises the former hunting lodge of the Prussian kings, which was in Königs Wusterhausen

Towns and municipalities

References

External links 

  (German)
Spreewald tourist website (German)
Spreewald Biosphere Reserve (German)